Corrie Richard Ndaba (born 25 December 1999) is an Irish professional footballer who plays as a centre-back for Fleetwood Town, on loan from Ipswich Town.

Internationally, Ndaba has played for the Republic of Ireland U18 team, and has also received a call up from Stephen Kenny to the U21 team.

Club career

Ipswich Town
Ndaba joined the Ipswich Town Academy as a scholar in 2016. He featured regularly for Ipswich's U23s during the 2018–19 season as Ipswich won the Professional Development League South Division. He signed his first professional contract in February 2019, signing a three-year deal with the option of an additional year extension. Upon signing the contract, Ipswich manager Paul Lambert said that because Ndaba was left-footed, he had a chance to make it at the club if he improved his physique.

In November, it was announced that he was to move on loan to National League South team Chelmsford City for one month, but the move was delayed due to financial difficulties suffered by Chelsmford. Instead, he and teammate Bailey Clements were sent on loan to Hemel Hempstead Town for a month, where they were managed by former Ipswich player Sammy Moore. After his loan at Hemel Hempstead ended, he finally joined Chelmsford for a month. In January 2020, he was set to move on loan to Scottish Championship team Ayr United with teammate Aaron Drinan, but the move fell through due to his two prior loan spells earlier in the season.

Ndaba made his first-team debut for Ipswich on 5 September 2020, featuring as a second-half substitute in a 3–0 home win over Bristol Rovers in the EFL Cup. On 7 January 2021, Ndaba joined Ayr United on loan from the remainder of the 2020–21 season. He made his debut for Ayr on 23 January, keeping a clean sheet in a 0–0 draw away at Dunfermline Athletic. Ndaba was one of several Ayr defenders described by manager David Hopkin as "embarrassing" following a 3–0 defeat to Dundee on 6 April. He made 14 appearances during his loan spell at Ayr. Ndaba described his time at Ayr as "a good experience for me", adding that the football was "very physical up there and as a young centre-half it’s good for me to experience that".

Salford City (loan)
On 21 August 2021, Ndaba moved on loan to League Two team Salford City. On 27 August, he signed a new two-year contract with Ipswich, extending his stay at the club until 2023 with the option of an additional one-year extension. Speaking to the East Anglian Daily Times, Ndaba said his loan move was necessary for experience; "I'm physically ready but there are a lot of things you need to learn. This loan will benefit me and give me a better chance", and noting that the football played is "physical but we try to play as well... it's a mixture of that and it's going to benefit me". On 3 April 2022, he scored his first senior goal, the opening goal in a 2–0 away win against Hartlepool United. At the end of Salford's season, Ndaba was voted as the Supporters' Player of the Year. In total, he made 30 appearances in both his natural position of centre-back and at left-back, where he earned rave reviews, and scored two goals.

2022–23 loans
On 27 July, Ndaba signed a new three-year contract with Ipswich Town. On 19 August, Ndaba signed for Burton Albion on a season-long loan. On 31 January, Ndaba's loan was terminated and he joined Fleetwood Town until the end of the season.

International career
Born in Ireland, Ndaba is of South African descent. He won one cap for the Republic of Ireland U18 side in 2016. In March 2019, he was called up by Stephen Kenny to the Republic of Ireland U21 squad for European Championships qualifiers.

Style of play
Ndaba began his career as a centre midfielder at Cherry Orchard, but was converted to a centre defender upon signing for Ipswich. He is a quick player, who uses his strength and good positional sense to perform well in defence. He is a left-footed player, and was a captain in youth football due to his vocal nature. His manager at Ayr United, Mark Kerr, described him as "a big, strong, athletic defender who is quick and good on the ball", and his manager at Salford, Gary Bowyer, described him similarly as a player with "great pace, he's a ball-playing centre-half, but he's competitive as well". Former Ipswich manager Paul Cook praised his willingness to get involved, saying "he’s naturally aggressive, he wants to engage and have contact". In 2021, Ndaba described himself as "a modern day centre-half. I can play, I’m aggressive, I’m tall, so I have a bit of everything really".

Career statistics

Honours
Salford City
Salford City Player of the Year: 2021–22

References

External links
Corrie Ndaba profile at the Ipswich Town F.C. website

1999 births
Living people
Association footballers from Dublin (city)
Republic of Ireland association footballers
Republic of Ireland youth international footballers
Irish people of South African descent
Black Irish sportspeople
Irish expatriate sportspeople in England
Irish expatriate sportspeople in Scotland
Expatriate footballers in England
Expatriate footballers in Scotland
Republic of Ireland expatriate association footballers
Association football defenders
Ipswich Town F.C. players
Hemel Hempstead Town F.C. players
Chelmsford City F.C. players
Ayr United F.C. players
Salford City F.C. players
Burton Albion F.C. players
Fleetwood Town F.C. players
Scottish Professional Football League players
English Football League players